Blade Arcus from Shining (ブレードアークス・フロム・シャイニング) is a fighting game developed by Studio Saizensen and published by Sega. It features characters from the Shining series. The game is a crossover 2D fighting game featuring characters from Shining Blade and Shining Hearts.

Blade Arcus from Shining EX (ブレードアークス・フロム・シャイニング・イーエックス) was released on November 26, 2015 for the PlayStation 3 and PlayStation 4, adding new characters. The game was ported to Steam with online lobbies added on July 28, 2016 under the title Blade Arcus from Shining: Battle Arena.

On November 20, 2018, Blade Arcus Rebellion from Shining was announced for the PlayStation 4 and Nintendo Switch with a release date of March 14, 2019. It features extra characters from Shining Resonance Refrain.

Gameplay 
The game is played using an 8-directional joystick and four buttons. Three buttons, designated A, B, C, correspond respectively to the light, medium, and heavy attacks. The fourth, designated D, is used for the Support Link. Players select two characters to form a tag-team pairing. They control their primary characters, and are able to switch to using their supporting characters after each round.

Characters
Blade Arcus from Shining features sixteen playable characters drawn from across all Shining game series.

Reception

The game has received mixed reviews. Atomix said "the game seems a little lackluster when compared with other great fighting franchises. It is a really good fighting title, but one that will be enjoyed, mostly, by the followers from the original RPG series." Multiplayer.it said that it "delivers an enjoyable beat'em up experience, but lacks the depth of the best 2D fighting games."

See also
Blade Strangers - A 2018 fighting game, also developed by Studio Saizensen.

References

External links 
 Official site of Blade Arcus from Shining 
 Official site of Blade Arcus from Shining EX 
 Official site of Blade Arcus Rebelion from Shining EX 

2014 video games
ALL.Net games
Arcade video games
Nintendo Switch games
PlayStation 3 games
PlayStation 4 games
Shining (series)
Tag team videogames
Fighting games
Video games developed in Japan
Windows games